Trestonia albilatera is a species of beetle in the family Cerambycidae. It was described by Francis Polkinghorne Pascoe in 1859. It is known from Brazil.

References

albilatera
Beetles described in 1859